Amy Davis Irving (born September 10, 1953) is an American actress and singer, who worked in film, stage, and television. Her accolades include an Obie Award, and nominations for two Golden Globe Awards and an Academy Award.

Born in Palo Alto, California, to actors Jules Irving and Priscilla Pointer, Irving spent her early life in San Francisco before her family relocated to New York City during her teenage years. In New York, she made her Broadway debut in The Country Wife (1965–1966) at age 13. Irving subsequently studied theater at San Francisco's American Conservatory Theater and at the London Academy of Music and Dramatic Art before making her feature film debut in Brian De Palma's Carrie (1976), followed by a lead role in the 1978 supernatural thriller The Fury (1978).

In 1980, Irving appeared in a Broadway production of Amadeus and the film Honeysuckle Rose (1980), receiving a Razzie Award for Worst Supporting Actress. She was cast in Barbra Streisand's musical epic Yentl (1983), for which she was nominated for both an Academy Award for Best Supporting Actress and a Razzie Award for Worst Supporting Actress. In 1988, she received an Obie Award for her Off-Broadway performance in a production of The Road to Mecca, and was nominated for a Golden Globe Award for her performance in the comedy Crossing Delancey (1988).

Irving went on to appear in the original Broadway production of Broken Glass (1994) and the revival of Three Sisters (1997). In film, she starred in the ensemble comedy Deconstructing Harry (1997), and reprised her role in The Rage: Carrie 2 (1999) before co-starring opposite Michael Douglas in Steven Soderbergh's crime-drama Traffic (2000). She subsequently appeared in the independent films Thirteen Conversations About One Thing (2001) and Adam (2009). From 2006 to 2007, she starred in the Broadway production of The Coast of Utopia. In 2018, she reunited with Soderbergh, appearing in a supporting role in his horror film Unsane.

Early life
Irving was born on September 10, 1953, in Palo Alto, California. Her father was film and stage director Jules Irving (born Jules Israel) and her mother is actress Priscilla Pointer. Her brother is writer and director David Irving and her sister, Katie Irving, is a singer and teacher of deaf children. Irving's father was of Russian-Jewish descent, and one of Irving's maternal great-great-grandfathers was also Jewish. Irving was raised in her mother's faith of Christian Science, and her family observed no religious traditions.

She spent her early life in San Francisco, California, where her father co-founded the Actor's Workshop, and where she was active in local theater as a child. She attended the American Conservatory Theater in San Francisco in the late 1960s and early 1970s, and appeared in several productions there. She also trained at the London Academy of Music and Dramatic Art. As a teenager, Irving relocated with her family to New York City, where her father was appointed the director of the Lincoln Center Repertory Theater. There, Irving graduated from the Professional Children's School. She made her Off-Broadway debut at age 17 in And Chocolate on Her Chin.

Career
Irving's first stage appearance was at nine months old in the production "Rumplestiltskin" where her father brought her on the stage to play the part of his child who he trades for spun gold. Then at age two, she portrayed a bit-part character ("Princess Primrose") in a play which her father directed. She had a walk-on role in the 1965–66 Broadway show The Country Wife at age 12. Her character was to sell a hamster to Stacy Keach in a crowd scene. The play was directed by family friend Robert Symonds, the associate director of the Lincoln Center Repertory Theater, and who later became her stepfather after her father died and her mother remarried. Within six months of returning to Los Angeles from London Academy of Music and Dramatic Art in the mid-1970s, Irving was cast in a major motion picture and was working on various TV projects such as guest spots in Police Woman, Happy Days, and a lead role in the mini-series epic Once an Eagle opposite veterans Sam Elliott and Glenn Ford, and a young Melanie Griffith. She played Juliet in Romeo and Juliet at the Los Angeles Free Shakespeare Theatre in 1975, and returned to the role at the Seattle Repertory Theatre (1982–1983).

Irving auditioned for the role of Princess Leia in Star Wars, which went to Carrie Fisher. She then starred in the Brian DePalma-directed films Carrie as Sue Snell (her mother was also in Carrie), and The Fury as Gillian Bellaver. In 1999, she reprised her role as Sue Snell in The Rage: Carrie 2. She starred with Richard Dreyfuss in 1980 in The Competition. Also in 1980, she appeared in Honeysuckle Rose, which also marked her on-screen singing debut. Both her and Dyan Cannon's characters were country-and-western singers, and both actresses did their own singing in the film. In 1983, she featured in Barbra Streisand's directorial debut, Yentl, for which she received an Academy Award nomination for Best Supporting Actress. In 1984, she co-starred in Micki + Maude. In 1988, she was in Crossing Delancey (for which she received a Golden Globe nomination). That same year, she also gave another singing performance in the live-action/animated film Who Framed Roger Rabbit, providing the singing voice for Jessica Rabbit. In 1997, she appeared in Woody Allen's Deconstructing Harry. Irving also appeared in the TV show Alias as Emily Sloane, portrayed Princess Anjuli in the big-budget miniseries epic The Far Pavilions and headlined the lavish TV production Anastasia: The Mystery of Anna. More recently Irving appeared in the films Traffic (2000), Tuck Everlasting (2002), Thirteen Conversations About One Thing (2002) and an episode of Law & Order: Special Victims Unit in 2001.

Irving's stage work includes on-Broadway shows such as Amadeus (replacing Jane Seymour due to pregnancy) at the Broadhurst Theatre for nine months, Heartbreak House with Rex Harrison at the Circle in the Square Theatre, Broken Glass at the Booth Theatre and Three Sisters with Jeanne Tripplehorn and Lili Taylor at the Roundabout Theatre. Additional Off-Broadway credits include: The Heidi Chronicles; The Road to Mecca; The Vagina Monologues in both London and New York; The Glass Menagerie with her mother, actress Priscilla Pointer; Celadine, a world premiere at George Street Playhouse in New Brunswick, New Jersey; and the 2006 one-woman play, A Safe Harbor for Elizabeth Bishop. In 1994, she and Anthony Hopkins hosted the 48th Tony Awards at the Gershwin Theatre, New York.

Irving's last Broadway appearance was in the American premiere of Tom Stoppard's The Coast of Utopia at New York's Lincoln Center during its 2006–07 season. In 2009, she played the title role in Saint Joan, in an audio version by the Hollywood Theater of the Ear. In May 2010, Irving made her Opera Theatre of Saint Louis debut in the role of Desiree Armfeldt in Isaac Mizrahi's directorial debut of Stephen Sondheim's A Little Night Music.

In October 2010, Irving guest-starred in "Unwritten," the third episode of the seventh season of the Fox series House M.D.. In 2013, Irving appeared in a recurring role in the cancelled Zero Hour. In 2018, she co-starred in the psychological horror film Unsane, directed by Steven Soderbergh.

In April of 2023, Amy released her first album, Born In A Trunk, featuring 10 cover songs pulled from her life and career.

Personal life
Irving dated American film director Steven Spielberg from 1976 to 1980. She then had a brief relationship with Willie Nelson, her co-star in the film Honeysuckle Rose. The breakup with Spielberg cost her the role of Marion Ravenwood in Raiders of the Lost Ark, which he had offered to her at the time, but they reunited and were married from 1985 to 1989. She received an estimated $100 million divorce settlement after a judge controversially vacated a prenuptial agreement that had been written on a napkin.

In 1989, she became romantically and professionally involved with Brazilian film director Bruno Barreto; they were married in 1996 and divorced in 2005. She has two sons: Max Samuel (with Spielberg), born June 13, 1985; and Gabriel Davis (with Barreto), born May 4, 1990.

She married Kenneth Bowser Jr., a documentary filmmaker, in 2007. He has a daughter, Samantha, from a previous marriage with entertainment lawyer Marilyn Haft. , Irving resides in New York City.

Filmography

Film

Television

Stage credits

Albums

Accolades

References

External links

1953 births
20th-century American actresses
21st-century American actresses
Actresses from New York City
Actresses from Palo Alto, California
Actresses from San Francisco
Actresses from the San Francisco Bay Area
Alumni of the London Academy of Music and Dramatic Art
American Christian Scientists
American Conservatory Theater alumni
American film actresses
American people of Jewish descent
American people of Russian-Jewish descent
American Shakespearean actresses
American stage actresses
American voice actresses
Audiobook narrators
Family of Steven Spielberg
Living people
Obie Award recipients
Outstanding Performance by a Cast in a Motion Picture Screen Actors Guild Award winners